Escadrille 23 of the French Air Force was formed at Brie on 4 August 1914.

History

Escadrille 23 was equipped with Morane-Saulniers and forwarded to VI Armee of the French Army in September, and transferred to IV Armee in October 1914. Later that month, it moved to the Somme. It would operate from there until 6 August 1915. It then returned to the VI Armee for a short spell before being posted to IV Armee on 21 August 1915.

 
On 20 September 1915, the unit re-equipped with Nieuports and became Escadrille N23. Its performance earned it a citation in orders on 5 November 1916. It was credited with victories over 17 enemy aircraft and four observation balloons. On 3 February 1917, the escadrille was posted to VII Armee; it soon moved to support II Armee. On 19 March 1918, the escadrille earned the fourragere of the Croix de Guerre by being cited again, for downing another 23 enemy airplanes. The unit subsequently retooled with SPAD fighters, but did not change its designation to Escadrille SPA.23 until August 1918. Wartime victories for Escadrille SPA.23 totaled 59 aircraft destroyed.

Escadrille SPA.23 still serves in today's French Air Force.

Commanding officers

 Capitaine Auguste de Reverend: 4 August 1914 - 8 December 1915
 Lieutenant Louis Robert de Beauchamp: 9 December 1915 - KIA 17 December 1916
 Capitaine Pierre de Langle de Cary: 18 December 1916 - September 1917
 Capitaine Armand Pinsard: September 1917 -

Notable personnel

 Capitaine Armand Pinsard
 Adjutant Maxime Lenoir
 Lieutenant Jean Casale
Lieutenant Eugène Gilbert
 Lieutenant François de Rochechouart

Aircraft

 Morane-Saulnier: 4 August 1914
 Nieuport: 20 September 1915
 SPAD: Summer 1918

Endnotes

References  
 Franks, Norman; Frank W. Bailey. Over the Front: A Complete Record of the Fighter Aces and Units of the United States and French Air Services, 1914-1918 Grub Street, 1992. , .

Further reading 

 Bailey, Frank W., and Christophe Cony. French Air Service War Chronology, 1914-1918: Day-to-Day Claims and Losses by French Fighter, Bomber and Two-Seat Pilots on the Western Front. London: Grub Street, 2001. 
 Davilla, James J., and Arthur M. Soltan. French Aircraft of the First World War. Stratford, CT: Flying Machines Press, 1997. 
 Les escadrilles de l'aéronautique militaire française: symbolique et histoire, 1912-1920. Vincennes: Service historique de l'armée de l'air, 2004.

External links
 Escadrille MS 23 - N 23 - SPA 23

French Air and Space Force squadrons